The 1996–97 Alabama Crimson Tide men's basketball team represented the University of Alabama in the 1996–97 NCAA Division I men's basketball season. The team's head coach was David Hobbs, who was in his fifth season at Alabama.  The team played their home games at Coleman Coliseum in Tuscaloosa, Alabama. They finished the season with a record of 17–14, with a conference record of 6–10, which placed them in a tie for third in the SEC Western Division.

The Tide defeated Florida in the first round of the 1997 SEC men's basketball tournament, but lost to South Carolina in the quarterfinal.  The Tide did not an invite to a postseason tournament, marking the first time the Tide didn't participate in the postseason since the 1987–88 season.

Roster

Schedule and results

|-
!colspan=14 style=| Regular Season

|-
!colspan=9 style=| SEC Tournament

Sources

References 

Alabama Crimson Tide men's basketball seasons
Alabama
1996 in sports in Alabama
1997 in sports in Alabama